Jack Reynolds may refer to:

 Jack Reynolds (broadcaster) (1937–2008), American professional wrestling announcer
 Jack Reynolds (footballer, born 1869) (1869–1917), international football player for both Ireland and England
 Jack Reynolds (footballer, born 1881) (1881–1962), English football player and manager of Ajax Amsterdam
 Jack "Hacksaw" Reynolds (born 1947), American football player

See also
 John Reynolds (disambiguation)
 Reynolds (surname)